Elwy McMurran Yost,  (July 10, 1925 – July 21, 2011) was a Canadian television host, best known for hosting CBC Television's weekday Passport to Adventure series from 1965 to 1967, TVOntario's weekday Magic Shadows, from 1974 until the mid-1980s, and Saturday Night at the Movies from 1974 to 1999.

Early life
Born in Weston, Ontario, he was the son of pickle manufacturer Elwy Honderich Yost and Annie Josephine McMurran. In his youth, the senior Yost would give his son a dime a week to go see a movie on condition that he'd then recount the plot. Yost graduated from the Weston Collegiate and Vocational School in 1943.

He began studies at the University of Toronto in 1943, and studied engineering  but left in 1944, after failing his exams, and joined the Canadian Infantry in 1944. He was honorably discharged in September 1945. After graduating from the University of Toronto with a Bachelor of Arts degree in Sociology in 1948, he worked variously in construction, at the Canadian National Exhibition, made an independent film with a classmate and acted in summerstock theatre. In 1951, he was working in the circulation department of the Toronto Star where he met his future wife, Lila Melby. He also worked in the Avro Canada personnel department from 1953 until 1959 when he and most of the staff were laid off due to the cancellation of the Avro Arrow project. He then worked as an English and History teacher at Burnhamthorpe Collegiate Institute in Etobicoke, Ontario.

Career in television
Through his acting connections, Yost learned that CBC was looking for quiz show panelists. Yost auditioned and, through the 1960s,  appeared intermittently on the CBC as a panelist on shows such as Live a Borrowed Life, The Superior Sex and Flashback. In the mid 1960s, he created and hosted CBC's Passport to Adventure (TV series), featuring classic movie serials, and also assisted in the founding of the Metropolitan Educational Television Authority (META).

In the late 1960s, he hosted CBC Radio show It's Debatable.

He joined the Ontario Educational Communications Authority (later TVOntario) in the early 1970s as a manager and, in 1974, was assisting with the establishment of its regional councils, when he was told OECA had acquired the broadcast rights to three Ingmar Bergman films and was asked if he had any ideas on how the station could air them in an educational context. Yost packaged the shows as Three Films in Search of God adding educational content in the form of interviews, introductions, and discussions, thus creating the model for what became Saturday Night at the Movies, which became the channel's longest-running, and one of its most popular, shows. Yost also developed Magic Shadows, which showed classic serials in half-hour early evening installments with introductions providing background and interesting details by Yost; the movie review show Rough Cuts; Talking Film and The Moviemakers.  In 1979 he appeared in Ida Makes a Movie, the first of four television shorts that spawned The Kids of Degrassi Street in 1982 and by extension, the Degrassi media franchise.

The format of Saturday Night at the Movies was that of two movies, separated by in-depth interviews conducted by Yost. In the early years the interviews were with local film experts, but the show's producers took the opportunity to interview visiting actors when they had engagements in Toronto. As the show grew in popularity, funds were found to send Yost and a crew to Hollywood to arrange interviews with film personalities. The library includes interviews with the stars of classic films, character actors, directors, screenwriters, composers, film-editors, special-effects people, and sometimes even their children. 

Some regular viewers started to plan their Saturday nights so that they could catch just the interview section if they had already seen that night's films. When Yost retired from TVOntario in 1999, a copy of the library of interviews was donated to the Motion Picture Academy. 

His son, Graham Yost, is a screenwriter whose most famous credit was the hit 1994 film Speed. Speed was the final movie Yost hosted before retiring from Saturday Night at the Movies in 1999.

Yost wrote four books: Magic Moments from the Movies, Secret of the Lost Empire, Billy and the Bubbleship (also known as Mad Queen of Mordra) and White Shadows the latter being a mystery novel, published in 2003.

Death
Yost recovered from "a serious operation" he had in 2005, according to his wife, Lila. He died in West Vancouver, British Columbia on July 21, 2011, aged 86.

Honours
In 1999, he was made a Member of the Order of Canada. In the same year, he was awarded the Clyde Gilmour Award by the Toronto Film Critics Association.

In 2021, TVOntario aired Magic Shadows, Elwy Yost: A Life in Movies, a documentary by Karen Shopsowitz about Yost's life and influence.

Bibliography
 Magic Moments from the Movies (1978) 
 The Mad Queen of Mordra (1987) 
 Billy and the Bubbleship (1982) *also published as The Mad Queen of Mordra
 Secrets of the Lost Empire (1980)

References

External links
 

1925 births
2011 deaths
Canadian male novelists
Canadian television hosts
Canadian film historians
Members of the Order of Canada
Writers from British Columbia
Writers from Toronto
University of Toronto alumni
People from West Vancouver
20th-century Canadian novelists
20th-century Canadian male writers
Canadian male non-fiction writers